Ray or Raymond Chang may refer to:

 G. Raymond Chang (1948–2014), CEO of CI Financial, philanthropist, chancellor of Ryerson University
 Ray Chang (baseball) (born 1983), Chinese-American infielder
 Raymond Chang (chemist) (1939–2017), emeritus professor at Williams College
 Ray Chang (actor) (born 1985), Taiwanese actor

See also
 Ray Chan (disambiguation)
 Ray Chen (disambiguation)